The 1984–85 Honduran Liga Nacional season was the 19th edition of the Honduran Liga Nacional.  The format of the tournament consisted of a four round-robin schedule followed by a 4-team playoff round.  Club Deportivo Olimpia won the title after winning both rounds and qualified to the 1985 CONCACAF Champions' Cup along with runners-up C.D.S. Vida.

1984–85 teams

 Juventud Morazánica (Tegucigalpa)
 Marathón (San Pedro Sula)
 Motagua (Tegucigalpa)
 Olimpia (Tegucigalpa)
 Platense (Puerto Cortés)
 Real España (San Pedro Sula)
 Sula (La Lima, promoted)
 Universidad (Tegucigalpa)
 Victoria (La Ceiba)
 Vida (La Ceiba)

Regular season

Standings

Final round

Cuadrangular standings

Top scorer
  Luis O. Altamirano (Universidad) with 13 goals

Squads

Known results

Round 1

Cuadrangular

Unknown rounds

Reference

Liga Nacional de Fútbol Profesional de Honduras seasons
1
Honduras